Gatorade Center (formerly HK Areena, Elysée Arena, Typhoon Arena, but commonly referred to as Turkuhalli in Finnish and Åbohallen in Swedish) is a multi-functional indoor arena in the district of Artukainen in Turku, Finland. Opened in November 1990, it can hold up to 11,820 spectators for ice hockey games. 

It is primarily used for ice hockey, and is the home arena of TPS, but it is also frequently used to host concerts and other events such as the Maata Näkyvissä Festival. A record attendance of 12,041 for a hockey match was registered in 1991. Gatorade Center is a member of the European Arenas Association (EAA).

History

The arena, Turku Fair and Congress Centre, and a riding school were built on the former runways of the Artukainen Airport (1935–1955), which served as the main airport of Turku until Turku Airport was built in 1955.

The arena was built for the needs of hosting the Ice Hockey World Championships, during which it was the main venue of the games. There were, among others, matches of the group stage and the final stage of the tournament.

Construction
It was the first arena to be built in Finland with a capacity of more than 10,000 people. It was not until 1997 that a larger venue was opened, this being Hartwall Arena in the Finnish capital Helsinki.

The Gatorade Center was designed by architectural firm Casagrande and Haroma Oy and cost 145 million Finnmarks (24.4 million euros). The city of Turku paid 95 million Finnmarks (16 million euros) towards this.

Opening
The arena was opened, as Typhoon Arena, on November 25, 1990 by the Minister of Transport and Communications, Ilkka Kanerva. The first hockey match that took place on that day was played between TPS Turku and SaiPa. It was renamed Elysée Arena after its main sponsor Marli in the summer of 1994 and retained this name until 2007. From the summer of 2006, the arena was called Turkuhalli, which has been used in marketing in addition to the sponsor's name since the early days of the venue.

In 1996 and 1997, the arena was extended by an annex, which contained a second entrance, 28 new VIP boxes, space for a new restaurant and a new vestibule. The extension cost was 6 million euros.

In 1998, the overall look of the arena's restaurants was redesigned by renovator Sedu Koskinen. A full renovation of the arena took place between 2016 and 2018.

Oy Turkuhalli-Åbohallen Ab, founded by the City of Turku in 1989, merged with Kiinteistö Oy Turku Monitoimihalli which owns the venue, in 2010. Kiinteistö Oy Turku Monitoimihalli is also wholly owned by the city.

Events
Gatorade Center was the main venue for the 1991 Men's World Ice Hockey Championships and one of the venues in 1997 and 2003.

Janet Jackson performed there on 13 May 1998 as part of her The Velvet Rope Tour. Bon Jovi started their European leg of the Crush Tour at the arena on 5 August 2000. Enrique Iglesias performed at the arena during his Euphoria Tour on 6 April 2011. Bruce Springsteen had two shows at the arena during his Wrecking Ball World Tour: 7 and 8 May 2013.

In 2017, the opening and closing of Europeade, the largest European costume and folklore festival took place in the arena.

See also
List of European ice hockey arenas
List of indoor arenas in Finland
List of indoor arenas in Nordic countries

References

External links

 

Indoor arenas in Finland
Indoor ice hockey venues in Finland
Buildings and structures in Turku
Tourist attractions in Turku
Sports venues completed in 1990
1990 establishments in Finland